The Automotive industry in Kenya is primarily involved in the assembly, retail and distribution of motor vehicles. There are a number of motor vehicle dealers operating in the country.

Local automotive companies

Kenya is currently attempting to completely build its own cars. After building its first car in the late 80's (the Nyayo Car), Kenya has a shot at the industry with Mobius Motors, which was founded in 2009. with KIBO Africa Limited, motorcycles have been rolling out from this local manufacturer.

Nyayo

Mobius Motors

Challenges
The established dealers face intense competition from imported second-hand vehicles, mainly from Japan and United Arab Emirates. Another issue is that there is more demand for second-hand vehicles rather than new ones because Kenya is generally a lower middle-income country. Thus, Mobius Motors was established to provide low cost cars at about KES. 1,100,000 (US$11,000).

In the beginning of 2019, the Government of Kenya proposed to implement a National Automotive Policy which effectively would see an eventual ban on imports of second hand passenger and commercial vehicles. However, this was faced with stiff resistance from the used car industry with the government eventually having to suspend their push to change the regulations on 7 May 2019.

Timeline of the Kenyan car industry

1960s – Volkswagen assembled the Beetle in Kenya
1976 – First Kenyan Assembled car by Kenya Vehicle Manufacturers
1977 – First Assembled car by Associated Vehicle Assemblers Ltd.
1986 – Nyayo Car, Kenya's first car is built. The car achieves 120 km/h (75 mph)
2009 – Mobius Motors is established by Joel Jackson
2013 – 52.3% of new cars sold in Kenya are assembled in Kenya
2016 – Volkswagen starts assembly of Polo Vivo in Kenya in Cooperation with Kenya Vehicle Manufacturers and distributor DT Dobie

Major retailers
Toyota East Africa/Toyota Kenya
Cooper Motor Corporation,
General Motors East Africa (GMEA) Now Isuzu East Africa Ltd. since 2017.
Simba Colt
DT Dobie for VW.
Inchcape Kenya Ltd
Beiben Trucks – Nelion Trading Ltd
Urysia Limited for Peugeot
Transafrica Motors Ltd (FAW & IVECO)

Major assemblers
Kenya Vehicle Manufacturers (KVM) – Assembles for Hyundai Motor, Volkswagen,  and Peugeot S.A.
General Motors East Africa (GMEA) Now Isuzu East Africa Ltd. since 2017.
Honda Motorcycle Kenya Ltd
Associated Vehicle Assemblers Ltd (AVA). (Largest Assembler in Kenya) Also Assembles for Toyota (East Africa)/ Toyota Kenya Ltd (TKL)
TVS Motors Kenya
Associated Motors (AM)
Transafrica Motors Ltd-Mombasa (FAW & IVECO)

Future assemblers
Tata Motors

References

External links
Kenya Motor Industry Association

Motor vehicle manufacturers of Kenya
Industry in Kenya